Levanger-Avisa is a regional newspaper in Norway. The newspaper was founded in 1848 and it is Norway's fifth-oldest newspaper. It is part of Adresseavisen Media Group. The publisher is a company with the same name, Levanger-Avisa AS. Levanger-Avisa became the Local Newspaper of the Year in Norway in 1999.

See also
List of Norwegian newspapers

References

External links
 www.levangeravisa.no

1848 establishments in Norway
Newspapers published in Norway
Mass media in Trøndelag
Norwegian-language newspapers
Polaris Media
Publications established in 1848